The Faculty of Medicine, University of Malaya (commonly known as the UM Medical School, FoM UM, UM Medicine or Malaya Medicine) is one of the thirteen faculties of the University of Malaya (UM). It was officially established in September 1962 after the establishment of the university's Kuala Lumpur, campus; it was the first medical school established in Malaysia. 

The faculty is well-known for its medical education and research, especially in the discovery of the Nipah virus (1998–1999 Malaysia Nipah virus outbreak). 

The faculty is widely regarded as the top medical school in Malaysia, being placed at No. 145 in the world in the subject of Medicine in the QS World University Subject Rankings 2021; this makes it the highest ranked medical school in Malaysia and the third highest in Southeast Asia.

History
The Faculty of Medicine was first established in Singapore as the Straits Settlements and the Federated Malay States Government Medical School in 1905, which trained physicians from present day Singapore and Malaysia. It was located within a former women's mental asylum at Sepoy Lines. The start of this medical school was significant in two ways. It trained local people to bring Western medicine to the population, and it was supported by merchants who took advantage of the tax exemptions to give generously to public causes. One notable donor was Tan Jiak Kim, a prominent Straits-born Chinese merchant. Another, Tan Chay Hoon, donated a building to the school in memory of his father, Tan Teck Guan. The Tan Teck Guan Building was built in 1911.

In 1921, the school was renamed the King Edward VII College of Medicine (KECM), after a donation from the Edward VII Memorial Fund. It was founded by Lim Boon Keng. In 1926, the College of Medicine Building was built to house the college in addition to the Tan Teck Guan Building. The dental school was founded shortly after.

During World War II, the college operated during the Japanese occupation of Singapore, but some people were killed. The first casualty was a fourth-year medical student based at Tan Tock Seng Hospital who was fatally wounded during the Battle of Singapore. While his friends were burying him, they were spotted by Japanese soldiers and eleven were killed on the spot. The dead are commemorated by the SGH War Memorial.

In 1949, the KECM merged with Raffles College to form the Singapore campus of UM. The medical school became the Faculty of Medicine of UM, and students in Malaysia wishing to study medicine would have to go to the campus in Singapore. In 1962, UM split into UM (Kuala Lumpur) and the University of Singapore, with the medical school in Singapore coming under the University of Singapore, while the UM in Kuala Lumpur established the present faculty. The founder Dean of the Faculty was Tan Sri Emeritus Prof Dr. Thamboo John Danaraj. On 5 May 2005, T.J. Danaraj Medical Library was named in memory of the Dean.

Discovery of Nipah Virus

Silent Mentor 
In affiliation with Taiwan's Tzu Chi University, the Faculty launched the first Silent Mentor program outside of Taiwan in 2012 . The program serves as the platform for the public to pledge and donate their bodies for medical education and research. The donors are addressed as "Silent Mentors" as they teach and educate medical students and professionals despite not speaking any words. After the week-long training workshop, the bodies of the "Silent Mentors" will be returned to the family members to be cremated. The program is largely different from the traditional cadaveric teaching in medical schools around the globe as most cadavers are unidentified bodies, however in this "Silent Mentor" program, the students are exposed to the life stories of each of the "Silent Mentors" and this is done to allow students learn Medicine in a humanistic approach.

Admissions and programmes
The faculty provides several undergraduate and postgraduate degrees in the field of medical and health sciences. These include:

Undergraduate
Bachelor of Medicine, Bachelor of Surgery (MBBS, also known as the University of Malaya Medical Program (UMMP))
The UMMP is a five-year professional undergraduate medical degree, divided into two years of pre-clinical studies and three years of clinical studies. Entry into the programme is highly competitive, as applicants have to go through a stringent selection process including fulfilling its minimum academic requirement (CGPA 3.80 for Malaysian Matriculation Programme and UM Foundation candidates, Minimum 3 As for GCE Advanced Level candidates), sitting for the BioMedical Admissions Test (BMAT), and attending the multiple mini-interview (MMI). With one intake in September, FoM admits only about 150 medical students each year.
 The degree of M.B.B.S. offered is one of only 2 Malaysian medical degrees recognised by the Singapore Medical Council
Bachelor of Biomedical Science (BBiomedSc (Hons.))
Bachelor of Nursing Science (BNSC)
Bachelor of Pharmacy (The programme was suspended in 2018, and reintroduced under the newly established Faculty of Pharmacy in 2019.)

Postgraduate
Clinical Masters Degree
Master of Medical Physics (MMedPhysics – the only programme outside the UK and Ireland that is accredited by the Institute of Physics and Engineering in Medicine (IPEM) since 2002.)
Master of Nursing Science (MNSc)
Master of Public Health (MPH)
Master of Medical Education
Master of Health Research Ethics (Developed in partnership with the Johns Hopkins Berman Institute of Bioethics)
Master of Medical Science (Physiology, MMedSc Phy)
Master of Medical Science (Regenerative Medicine)
Master of Medical Science (MMedSc)
Doctor of Medicine (MD)
Doctor of Public Health [DrPH)
Doctor of Philosophy (PhD)

Teaching hospitals
 University of Malaya Medical Centre (UMMC) 
 The 1,617-bed UMMC is the first and largest teaching hospital as well as the second largest hospital in Malaysia. It serves as the primary teaching hospital for FoM and is one of the main tertiary hospitals in the Klang Valley, receiving over a million outpatients every year. It also serves as a referral centre from hospitals throughout the region.
 Tengku Ampuan Rahimah Hospital, Klang

Research centres
The faculty includes the following research centres:

 Centre of Excellence for Research in AIDS (CERiA)
 Established in 2007 and is currently the only HIV and infectious diseases research centre in Malaysia and one of a few in the region.
 Centre for Epidemiology and Evidence-Based Practice (CEBP)
 Centre for Population Health (CePH)
 Officially launched by the Vice-Chancellor of the UM on 18 February 2009.
 National Orthopaedic Centre of Excellence for Research and Learning (NOCERAL)
 Established in 2003, NOCERAL serves as a centre for education, research and a wide range of orthopaedic sub-specialty clinical services.
 The centre is supported by Yayasan Ortopedik, which was set up by Dato' Dr. Mahmood Merican in 2007 with an initial fund of RM500,000.
 Shimadzu-UMMC Centre for Xenobiotic Studies (SUCXES)
 University of Malaya Centre for Proteomics Research (UMCPR)
 University of Malaya Eye Research Centre (UMERC)
 University of Malaya Research Imaging Centre (UMRIC)
 Tropical Infectious Disease Research and Education Centre (TIDREC)
 Established in 2008, TIDREC serves as a focal point for national and international collaborative research on tropical infectious diseases as well as education that serves the health needs of global communities.
 TIDREC is recognised as one of the Higher Institution Centre of Excellence (HICoE) by the Ministry of Higher Education (Malaysia), and it also houses the WHO Collaborating Centre for Arbovirus Reference & Research
 First research centre in the Malaysia to install fully certified modular biosafety level 2 & 3 laboratories for research involving highly virulent pathogens. TIDREC is also the only centre currently operating a mock biosafety level 3 training facility.

Academic profile

Publications

Journals 

 Journal of University of Malaya Medical Centre (JUMMEC)
 Biomedical Imaging and Intervention Journal (BIIJ)

Organisations 

 University of Malaya Medical Society (UM MedSoc)
 The UM MedSoc has its roots to the Medical Society (Medsoc) that was first formed in 1949 at the University of Malaya in Singapore, headed by Mr. Goon Sek Mun. Subsequently after the separation of Singapore from Malaysia, the present-day Faculty of Medicine was set up in the Kuala Lumpur campus of University of Malaya and a separate Medical Society was set up. It remains as the oldest medical student organisation and society in the medical fraternity in Malaysia. Till this date, the UM MedSoc has frequently collaborated with the Yong Loo Lin School of Medicine's Medical Society to organise events for its members across Malaysia and Singapore, namely the MUNUS Games and most recently, MUUINUS in 2020, which was an online e-gaming competition held between the two medical schools, with an addition of University of Indonesia.
 University of Malaya Students' Union (UMSU) - Faculty of Medicine
 University of Malaya Medical Alumni Association

Notable alumni

Straits Settlements and Federated Malay States Government Medical School (1905-1921) 

 Abdul Latiff bin Abdul Razak (1919), the first Malay to be a qualified physician
 Chen Su Lan(1910), social reformer and anti-opium activist

King Edward VIII College of Medicine (1925–49) 
 Awang Hassan (1934) – fifth Yang di-Pertua Negeri of Penang
 Lim Han Hoe – Singaporean physician and politician
 Mahathir Mohamad (1953) – fourth and seventh Prime Minister of Malaysia
 Salma Ismail (1947) – first Malay woman to qualify as a physician
 Siti Hasmah Mohamad Ali – wife of Mahathir
 Benjamin Sheares (LMS, 1929) – second President of Singapore
 Tan Chee Khoon (1949) – Malaysian politician known as "Mr. Opposition", co-founder of Parti Gerakan Rakyat Malaysia

Faculty of Medicine, University of Malaya (1962–present) 
 Awang Bulgiba Awang Mahmud - First Malaysian doctor to gain a PhD in Health Informatics
 Chua Soi Lek - Former Minister of Health
 Lee Boon Chye - Former Deputy Minister of Health

Notable academics 
Lam Sai Kit (Virology)
Awang Bulgiba Awang Mahmud (Public Health)
 Looi Lai Meng (Histopathology). Recipient of the Merdeka Award, Inaugural National Distinguished Professor awarded by the Ministry of Higher Education, Malaysia, Council Member of the Academy of Medicine of Malaysia
Woo Yin Ling (Gynecologic Oncology). She established Program ROSE, which introduces a revolutionary approach to cervical cancer screening that improves accessibility of testing and follow-up for women everywhere
Hany Binti Mohd Ariffin (Pediatric Oncology). Won the Anugerah Akademik Negara award in 2015, received the Distinguished Researcher Award from UM in 2018 and has been the Malaysian lead for the Malaysia-Singapore (MASPORE) Leukemia Study Group since 2003

Deans of the Faculty 

 Tan Sri Emeritus Professor Thamboo John Danaraj (The Founder Dean) -  February 1963 ~ March 1975
 Professor Datuk Dr. Lau Kam Seng - March 1975 ~ May 1976
 Professor Dato' Dr. Khairuddin Yusof - May 1976 ~ July 1977
 Professor Datuk Dr. K Somasundaram July 1977 ~ 28 February 1981
 Professor Dr. T.A. Sinnathuray 1 March 1981 ~ 13 May 1985
 Professor Dato' Dr. Khairuddin Yusof - 13 May 1985 ~ 15 April 1986
 Professor Dr. Anuar Zaini Mohd. Zain - 16 April 1986 ~ 31 March 1990
 Professor Dr. Jason Teoh Soon Teong - 1 April 1990 ~ 31 March 1992
 Professor Dato' Dr. Anuar Zaini Mohd Zain - 1 April 1992 ~ 31 March 2000
 Tan Sri Professor Dr. Mohd Amin Jalaludin - 1 April 2000 ~ 31 July 2006
 Professor Dato' Dr. Ikram Shah Ismail - 1 August 2006 ~ 1 July 2011
 Professor Dato' Dr. Adeeba Kamarulzaman - 1 July 2011 ~ 2 December 2020
 Professor Dr. April Camilla Roslani - 3 December 2020 ~ Present

Achievements
 The Merdeka Award: Nipah Virus Encephalitis Investigation Team from the Faculty of Medicine, University of Malaya
In 2020, Subashan Vadibeler, a final year (Stage 3.3) medical student from the Faculty of Medicine, was awarded the Rhodes Scholarship. He was the 7th Malaysian to receive this prestigious scholarship. He was also the first student from a Malaysian university to receive this honour (the previous 6 Malaysians who at the time were awarded the scholarship were studying in universities overseas).

See also
Faculty of Medicine, University of Malaya
University of Malaya
University of Malaya Medical Centre
National University of Singapore
Yong Loo Lin School of Medicine

References

1962 establishments in Malaya
Educational institutions established in 1962
University of Malaya
Malaya, Faculty of Medicine, University of